Carroll Hill is a mountain located in the Catskill Mountains of New York southwest of Trout Creek. Bullock Hill is located northeast and Clabber Peak is located south-southeast of Carroll Hill.

References

Mountains of Delaware County, New York
Mountains of New York (state)